The Infinity Coaster is a roller coaster design by Gerstlauer. A variant of the popular Euro-Fighter model, the Infinity Coaster allows for higher capacity through longer trains. The coaster also features a magnetic rollback system on rides with lifthills, to allow for easier evacuation of riders in breakdown situations. The ride car can now roll backwards with the magnetic fins deployed and the lift motor in reverse.

The first Infinity Coaster was The Smiler at Alton Towers in the UK, opened in 2013.

Installations

References

Mass-produced roller coasters
Roller coasters manufactured by Gerstlauer